Fluoranthene is a polycyclic aromatic hydrocarbon (PAH).  The molecule can be viewed as the fusion of naphthalene and benzene unit connected by a five-membered ring. Although samples are often pale yellow, the compound is colorless.  It is soluble in nonpolar organic solvents.  It is a member of the class of PAHs known as non-alternant PAHs because it has rings other than those with six carbon atoms. It is a structural isomer of the alternant PAH pyrene. It is not as thermodynamically stable as pyrene.  Its name is derived from its fluorescence under UV light.

Occurrence
Traces of fluoranthene is found in many combustion products, along with other PAHs. It results from incomplete combustion. Fluoranthene was originally isolated from coal tar pitch.  It is still obtained from the high boiling fraction of coal tar, representing a few percent by weight.

Pollutant
Fluoranthene is one of the U.S. Environmental Protection Agency's 16 priority pollutant PAHs. Fluoranthene has been classified by the International Agency for Research on Cancer as a group 3 carcinogen, "not classifiable as to its carcinogenicity to humans"[1] , however it was found to possess carcinogenic properties in case of newborn mice according to short-term lung tumor assay (Busby et al., 1984). In 2019, fluoranthene was added to the Candidate List of Substances of Very High Concern (SVHCs) due to its persistent, bioaccumulative and toxic (PBT) and very persistent and very bioaccumulative (vPvB) properties. Its occurrence in food has been assessed.

Its biodegradation has been elucidated.  The process commences with dihydroxylation at each of two kinds of CH=CH linkages.

References

External links
 National Pollutant Inventory - Polycyclic Aromatic Hydrocarbon Fact Sheet
 Chemical Profile for FLUORANTHENE from Scorecard
 FLUORANTHENE Chemical Fact Sheet by Spectrum Laboratories
 
 TOXICITY SUMMARY FOR FLUORANTHENE August 1993

Polycyclic aromatic hydrocarbons
Tetracyclic compounds
PBT substances